Juventus Football Club Youth Sector is the youth system of Italian football club Juventus. The Youth Sector is made up of various squads divided by age groups. Most of the squads train at the first team's former main training ground, Juventus Training Center, located in Vinovo.

The Youth Sector is divided into 11 squads: "Primavera" (under-19), "Allievi" (under-17), under-16, under-15, "Esordienti" (under-13), under-12, "Pulcini" (under-11), under-10, under-9, under-8 and under-7. In 2018, Juventus formed their reserve team (under-23), competing in the senior league system.

History
Despite an extensive international scouting network, the club has historically placed importance on nurturing local talent and continues to do so. One proof of this is the fact of the Italy national team, coached by Enzo Bearzot during the mid-1970s and mid-1980s, was mainly composed of young Juventus players – nicknamed the Blocco-Juve ("Juve-Block") – who formed the backbone of the national team. Examples include Roberto Bettega, Giuseppe Furino and Paolo Rossi, all former members at the Juventus youth program (then known as Nucleo Addestramento Giovani Calciatori or N.A.G.C.).

Graduates of the youth sector ply their trade in other Serie A clubs and top-flight leagues around Europe. More recently the 2012–13 Scudetto-winning squad featured Paolo De Ceglie, second vice-captain Claudio Marchisio, Sebastian Giovinco and Luca Marrone; the latter three were born and raised in the Turin area.

In 2018, Juventus formed a reserve team, Juventus Under-23, and was officially admitted to the Serie C. The club cannot play in the same division—or higher—as their senior team, nor can they compete in the Coppa Italia. They won their first trophy in their second year as a club, after beating Ternana in the 2020 Coppa Italia Serie C final.

From 2021, all clubs with teams competing in the Campionato Primavera 1 (under-19) also have to participate in the under-18 championship. However, since Juventus already have a reserve team they have the choice on whether or not to participate in the under-18 championship.

Structure

The club maintains several soccer schools, some satellite clubs and camps in Italy, the United States, Mexico and England and football initiatives such as the Juventus University, the first of its kind in the world (run jointly with the University of Turin) and the Juventus National Academy, launched to create a network of Juventus football schools (or academies) throughout Italy addressed to boys aged between 8 and 12 years old.

Juventus College
The Juventus College (J-College) was opened in September 2012. It is a boarding school founded mainly to cater to boys who do not reside within the city. It was initially founded as a collaboration with the Istituto Edoardo Agnelli, a high school founded by the Agnelli family's charitable foundation in collaboration with the Salesians, who have a long tradition and history of education in Turin. Since 2014, J-College has been overseen by the International School of Europe. Previously the boys, especially those from outside of the Turin area, would have to drop out of school and move there. J-College was modelled after Premier League clubs' youth academies, which cater to the educational needs of its youth players under 18 years old, in addition to providing lodging for non-local players.

J-College is an accredited scuola secondaria di secondo grado ("upper secondary school", ages 14 to 19) with two streams: a liceo scientifico offering the "applied sciences" option (opzione scienze applicate) and the liceo sportivo. Since 2014, it has been designated a liceo sportivo (sports school), the first of its kind in Italy, by the Ministry of Education, Universities and Research (MIUR). It also provides practical vocational training for the youth sector players past the mandatory schooling age of 16, in particular older boys in the Primavera age group.

Primavera (under-19s)

From the 2012–13 season, the Primavera team is composed of players who are at least 15 years old and who are under 19 in the calendar year in which the season ends. Until the 2011–12 season, the age limit was 20. According to Italian football league system, it is the main youth category.

The team competes in the Campionato Primavera 1. They have won four league titles, three Coppa Italia Primavera titles, and three Supercoppa Primavera titles. Juventus also won the Torneo di Viareggio a record nine times.

In 2007 the Juventus under-19 team finished runners-up in the inaugural edition of the Champions Youth Cup in Malaysia, intended to be a Club World Championship powered by G-14; the hed the best defence of the tournament with only two goals conceded in six matches. In the 2021–22 UEFA Youth League, Juventus were eliminated after penalty shoot-outs against Benfica at the semi-finals, their best-ever placement in the competition.

Current squad

Coaching staff

Honours

National
Campionato Nazionale Primavera (4): 1962–63, 1971–72, 1993–94, 2005–06
Coppa Italia Primavera (3): 1994–95, 2003–04, 2006–07, 2012–13
Supercoppa Primavera (3; record): 2006, 2007, 2013

International
Torneo di Viareggio (9; record): 1961, 1994, 2003, 2004, 2005, 2009, 2010, 2012, 2016

Notable youth team players

The following is a list of players who have played in the Juventus youth team and represented a country at full international level. Players in bold are currently playing at Juventus, or for another club on loan from Juventus.

 Max Vieri
 Angel Chibozo
 Simon Sluga
 Grigoris Kastanos
 José Cevallos
 Raman Chibsah
 Anastasios Donis
 Frantz Bertin
 Hörður Björgvin Magnússon
 Giancarlo Bercellino
 Roberto Bettega
 Carlo Bigatto
 Giampiero Boniperti
 Umberto Colombo
 Gianpiero Combi
 Domenico Criscito
 Alessandro Del Piero
 Giuseppe Furino
 Sebastian Giovinco
 Ciro Immobile
 Moise Kean
 Claudio Marchisio
 Domenico Marocchino
 Carlo Mattrel
 Antonio Nocerino
 Raffaele Palladino
 Carlo Parola
 Pietro Rava
 Enzo Robotti
 Tommaso Rocchi
 Paolo Rossi
 Daniele Rugani
 Luigi Sartor
 Leonardo Spinazzola
 Gino Stacchini
 Giuseppe Vavassori
 Abdoulaye Bamba
 Christian Manfredini
 Marcel Büchel
 Vykintas Slivka
 Gianluca Lapadula
 Viktor Budyanskiy
 Franck Kanouté
 Ayub Daud
 Jakub Hromada
 Andreas Isaksson
 Davide Chiumiento
 Andi Zeqiri
 César Pellegrín
 Christian Makoun
 Ilyos Zeytulayev

European record 

Key

By country

By club

See also
 Juventus Next Gen, reserve team

Notes

References

Bibliography

External links

 
 

Youth Sector
Football academies in Italy
UEFA Youth League teams
NextGen series